Klánovice is a municipal district and cadastral area in Prague, Czech Republic. Originally a village (since 1878), later municipality (since 1920), it became district of Prague in 1974.

It is located at the eastern limit of the city. It borders Prague 20 (Horní Počernice) in the northwest, Běchovice in the west, Újezd nad Lesy in the southwest and south and Prague-East District (municipality of Šestajovice) in the northeast.

References

External links 
 Praha-Klánovice - Official homepage

Districts of Prague